The S5 is a regional railway service of the S-Bahn Zürich on the Zürcher Verkehrsverbund (ZVV), Zürich transportation network. The S5 is one of the network's services connecting the cantons of Zürich, St. Gallen, Schwyz and Zug.

Route 
 

The S5 service links the city of Zug and Pfäffikon SZ, on the south shore of Lake Zürich in the canton of Schwyz. From there, they use the Zürich–Baden line to reach Zürich Hauptbahnhof and then the Zürich–Winterthur line to reach . Finally, trains cross the Seedamm on the Rapperswil–Pfäffikon line to reach Pfäffikon. The following stations are served:

 Zug
 Steinhausen Rigiblick
 Steinhausen
 Knonau
 Mettmenstetten
 Affoltern am Albis
 Hedingen
 Bonstetten-Wettswil
 Birmensdorf
 Urdorf Weihermatt
 Urdorf
 Zürich Altstetten
 Zürich Hardbrücke
 Zürich Hauptbahnhof

Rolling stock 

Before the timetable revision of late 2015 the S5 services were operated by RABe 514 class on the weekdays and RABe 511 class on weekends. , all services are operated by RABe 511 EMUs.

Scheduling 
The S5 has a normal frequency of one train every 30 minutes. The through journey time is just over one hour 30 minutes. Combined with the S15, the S5 provides quarter-hourly services at stations between Hardbrücke and Rapperswil.

History 
Prior to the timetable revision of late 2015, the section of the S5 between Zürich and Pfäffikon operated much as today, except that S5 also served Hurden. However west of Zürich, the trains operated to Oberglatt, where alternating trains continued to either Niederweningen or Rafz. The core of the line ran to a frequency of every half hour, thus providing hourly services to Niederweningen and Rafz. The section between  Oberglatt and Niederweningen was also served by an hourly shuttle service numbered S55, that were connected at Oberglatt with the S5 trains which ran to and from Rafz.

The sections of line no longer covered by the S5 and S55 are now served by the S9 (to Rafz) and S15 (to Niederweningen).

See also 

 Rail transport in Switzerland
 Trams in Zürich

References

External links 

 ZVV

Transport in the canton of Schwyz
Transport in the canton of St. Gallen
Transport in the canton of Zürich
Transport in the canton of Zug
Zürich S-Bahn lines